TSV Havelse is a German association football club based in Garbsen, Lower Saxony, near Hanover.

History
The club was founded in 1912 as FC Pelikan-Havelse by a group of thirteen young men from the small village of Havelse. They took their name from the maker's brand of the first football purchased by the club for the grand sum of 7,50 Reichsmarks. World War I took a heavy toll on the club, which was inactive for a time. In 1929, a local gymnastics club, Turnverein Havelse was formed and four years later the "Pelikans" took to the field again as the club's football side. Some time during the 1930s – club records are not clear – the club took on its current name.

For most of its existence this has been un-storied local side: the highlight for the team was a single season spent in the 2. Bundesliga in 1990–91. From 1986 to 1990 the club was led by Volker Finke, who played with the team from 1969 to 1974, and then went on to become the longtime coach of SC Freiburg. Their biggest achievements in the DFB-Pokal came against the same team. In 1991 and 2012, the club eliminated 1. FC Nürnberg to advance to the third and second round respectively of the competition proper.

Since 2010 the club has played in the tier four Regionalliga Nord with a second place in 2013 as its best result.

The club finished 3rd in the shortened 2020–21 Regionalliga Nord.  They qualified for the promotion play-offs, as the top two teams, Weiche Flensburg and Werder Bremen II did not apply for 3. Liga licenses. They achieved promotion to the 3. Liga after winning 2–0 on aggregate against 1. FC Schweinfurt.  However, they were relegated after just one season in the 3. Liga, with their relegation being confirmed on 16 April 2022 after a 1–1 draw vs. Hallescher FC.

Stadium
TSV Havelse plays in the Wilhelm-Langrehr-Stadion, originally built as the "TSV-Kampfbahn an der Hannoverschen Straße" in 1933. However, since the stadium does not meet the requirements for the 3. Liga, the club will play at the HDI-Arena in nearby Hanover for the duration of the 2021–22 season.

Honours
The club's honours:
 Oberliga Nord (III)
 Champions: 1989
 Runners-up: 1990
 Oberliga Niedersachsen-West
 Champions: 2010
 Lower Saxony Cup
 Winners: 2012, 2020

Current squad

Managerial history

  Hans Siemensmeyer (1 July 1975 – 30 June 1984)
  Günter Blume (1 July 1984 – 26 August 1985)
  Gerd Behrens (26 August 1985 – 12 February 1986)
  Volker Finke (13 February 1986 – 9 October 1990)
  Karl-Heinz Mrosko (13 October 1990 – 30 June 1991)
  Jürgen Stoffregen (1 July 1991 – 31 January 1993)
  Uwe Kliemann (24 January 1993 – 30 June 1993)
  Roman Wójcicki (1 July 1993 – 30 June 1995)
  unknown (1 July 1995 – 30 June 1997)
  Karl Eggestein (1 July 1997 – 30 June 1998)
  Frank Hartmann (1 July 1998 – 30 June 2000)
  Ronald Worm (1 July 2000 – 30 June 2001)
  Bernd Krajewski (1 July 2001 – 30 June 2004)
  Jürgen Stoffregen (1 July 2004 – 31 December 2010)
  André Breitenreiter (2 January 2011 – 30 June 2013)
  Christian Benbennek (1 July 2013 – 30 June 2015)
  Stefan Gehrke (1 July 2015 – 23 September 2015)
  Sören Halfar (int.) (24 September 2015 – 11 October 2015)
  Alexander Kiene (12 October 2015 – 30 June 2017)
  Christian Benbennek (1 July 2017 – 26 November 2018)
  Sahin Kilic (int.) (27 November 2018 – 9 December 2018)
  Jan Zimmermann (10 December 2018 – 30 June 2021)
  Rüdiger Ziehl (1 July 2021 – 30 June 2022)
  Philipp Gasde (1 July 2022 – 20 September 2022)
  Samir Ferchichi (21 September 2022 – )

References

External links
 

 
Football clubs in Germany
Football clubs in Lower Saxony
Association football clubs established in 1912
1912 establishments in Germany
Hanover Region
3. Liga clubs
2. Bundesliga clubs